Colombia competed at the 1980 Summer Paralympics in Arnhem, Netherlands. 11 competitors from Colombia won 2 medals, 1 gold and 1 bronze, and finished joint 31st in the medal table with Iceland.

See also 
 Colombia at the Paralympics
 Colombia at the 1980 Summer Olympics

References 

Colombia at the Paralympics
1980 in Colombian sport
Nations at the 1980 Summer Paralympics